Maksim Belyayev may refer to:
 Maksim Belyayev (ice hockey) (b. 1979), Kazakhstani ice hockey player
 Maksim Belyayev (footballer) (b. 1991), Russian football player